Uladzislaw Kasmynin (born 17 January 1990) is a Belarusian professional footballer who plays for Metallurg Bekabad.

Career

Club
On 31 March 2022, Istiklol confirmed the signing of Kasmynin.

Career statistics

Club

Honours
Naftan Novopolotsk
Belarusian Cup (1): 2008–09

AGMK
Uzbekistan Cup (1): 2018

Istiklol
 Tajikistan Higher League (1):2022
 Tajikistan Cup (1): 2022
 Tajik Supercup (1): 2022

References

External links

1990 births
Living people
Sportspeople from Vitebsk Region
Belarusian footballers
Association football defenders
Belarusian expatriate footballers
Expatriate footballers in Uzbekistan
Expatriate footballers in Kazakhstan
Expatriate footballers in Tajikistan
Uzbekistan Super League players
FC Naftan Novopolotsk players
FC Polotsk players
FC Volna Pinsk players
FC Granit Mikashevichi players
FC Vitebsk players
FC Neman Grodno players
FC AGMK players
FC Okzhetpes players
FC Istiklol players
PFK Metallurg Bekabad players